Frank Soldan "Bud" Holscher (born December 27, 1930) is an American professional golfer who played on the PGA Tour. He won the 1954 Labatt Open.

Early life and amateur career
Holscher was born on December 27, 1930, in Santa Monica, California. He attended Santa Monica Junior College, where he was a member of the golf team. He won the 1950 California State Junior College Championship.

Professional career
Holscher turned professional in mid-1953, while in the navy, and became eligible for prize money in PGA events from the start of 1954. In the first event of 1954, the Los Angeles Open, he finished tied for 4th place and won $1,075. In August he won the Labatt Open at Scarboro Golf and Country Club, Toronto. He trailed Wally Ulrich by 7 strokes after three rounds but won after a final round of 63, finishing 4 strokes ahead of Doug Ford and Dick Mayer. In November, he won the Hawaiian Open, a non-tour event, by 5 strokes from Tommy Bolt.

In February 1955, Holscher led the Tucson Open after three rounds but Tommy Bolt won after a last round 65, leaving Holscher tied with Art Wall Jr. as runners-up. In 1955 he also had his best finish in a major championship, tied for 7th at the U.S. Open, and was runner-up in the British Columbia Open two weeks later. In June 1956, he finished runner-up in the Philadelphia Daily News Open after losing at the second hole of a sudden-playoff to Dick Mayer.

Professional wins (5)

PGA Tour wins (1)

PGA Tour playoff record (0–1)

Other wins (4)
1954 Hawaiian Open
1960 California State Open, Southern California PGA Championship
1965 California State Open

Results in major championships

Note: Holscher never played in The Open Championship.

CUT = missed the half-way cut
"T" indicates a tie for a place

References

American male golfers
PGA Tour golfers
Golfers from California
1930 births
Living people